Tengchiena euroxestus is a species of very small air-breathing land snails, terrestrial pulmonate gastropod mollusks in the family Euconulidae, the hive snails. This species is endemic to Australia.

References

 WMSDB info, authority and date

Gastropods of Australia
Tengchiena
Gastropods described in 1937
Taxonomy articles created by Polbot